Brachiators are a type of primate mostly from the family Hylobatidae, which includes gibbons.  Brachiators use their arms to move from tree branch to tree branch, through a process called brachiation.  Their arms are longer than their legs, and are much more powerful.

Evolution
Brachiators began as four-footed monkey-like creatures in the Tertiary Era in Africa and Northern Europe.  Eventually, some of the monkeys began to use their arms to swing, and lost their tails, due to evolution.  They became apes with strong arms.  Through the ages, the ape-like ancestors developed stronger arms and the shoulder blades moved from the side of their chests to the back of their bodies.  

Most of these brachiators were smaller than average apes, so were able to move through the trees easier than gorillas or orangutans, although female orangutans do brachiate through the trees occasionally. The brachiators held their bodies upright in the trees, and would sometimes go on the ground and walk upright.  This helped them survive in the plains when the forests began to die, because they were so unfamiliar to the predators that they would not be attacked.

Physical features
Brachiators have:
broad hip sockets
broad upper bodies
shoulder blades further back
locking knee joints
elongated heel bones
aligned and longer big toes
upright body position
strong muscles behind the thighs and the pelvis
bend in their loins
slightly arched spine (S-shaped)
hands adapted to grasping branches
large incisors

References

Human Origin

Primatology